Retirement is the end of a person's career, usually due to old age.

Retirement may also refer to:

Arts, entertainment, and media
Retirement (Beanie Baby), the end of production of a Ty Beanie Baby
Retirement Living TV, now called RLTV, an American cable television network which transitioned its programming to an OTT channel in August 2018

Military
Withdrawal (military)

Sports 
 Out (baseball)
 Retirement (cricket)
 Retired number, a uniform number whose use a sports team has discontinued in honor of an outstanding member who held it